The 2015 Championship League was a professional non-ranking snooker tournament that was played from 5 January to 12 February 2015 at the Crondon Park Golf Club in Stock, England.

Judd Trump was the defending champion, but he was eliminated at the end of group three.

Barry Hawkins made the 111th official maximum break during his league stage match against Stephen Maguire in group one. This was Hawkins second official 147 break and the sixth in the 2014/2015 season. It was also the second maximum break in the history of the tournament. David Gilbert made the 114th maximum break and ninth of the season during group 7.

Stuart Bingham won in the final 3–2 against Mark Davis, and earned a place at the 2015 Champion of Champions.

Prize fund
The breakdown of prize money for this year is shown below:

Group 1–7
Winner: £3,000
Runner-up: £2,000
Semi-final: £1,000
Frame-win (league stage): £100
Frame-win (play-offs): £300
Highest break: £500
Winners' group
Winner: £10,000
Runner-up: £5,000
Semi-final: £3,000
Frame-win (league stage): £200
Frame-win (play-offs): £300
Highest break: £1,000

Tournament total: £180,100

Group one
Group one was played on 5 and 6 January 2015. Shaun Murphy was to take part in this group, but he was replaced by Mark King due to a bacterial chest infection. Barry Hawkins was the first player to qualify for the winners group.

Matches

Stuart Bingham 3–1 Marco Fu
Barry Hawkins 3–2 Neil Robertson
Stephen Maguire 0–3 Barry Hawkins
Judd Trump 2–3 Neil Robertson
Mark King 2–3 Stuart Bingham
Marco Fu 3–2 Judd Trump
Neil Robertson 3–1 Stephen Maguire
Barry Hawkins 2–3 Stuart Bingham
Mark King 3–1 Marco Fu
Judd Trump 1–3 Stephen Maguire
Stuart Bingham 3–0 Stephen Maguire
Neil Robertson 3–1 Marco Fu
Stuart Bingham 3–1 Neil Robertson
Barry Hawkins 1–3 Mark King
Marco Fu 3–1 Stephen Maguire
Mark King 1–3 Judd Trump
Mark King 0–3 Stephen Maguire
Barry Hawkins 3–2 Marco Fu
Stuart Bingham 0–3 Judd Trump
Mark King 1–3 Neil Robertson
Barry Hawkins 3–2 Judd Trump

Table

Play-offs

Group two
Group two was played on 7 and 8 January 2015. The group was won by Matthew Selt, who was a late replacement for Neil Robertson.

Matches

Judd Trump 3–0 Marco Fu
Stuart Bingham 3–2 Matthew Selt
Ali Carter 3–1 Robert Milkins
Michael Holt 3–2 Stuart Bingham
Marco Fu 3–2 Ali Carter
Robert Milkins 3–2 Michael Holt
Matthew Selt 3–2 Judd Trump
Stuart Bingham 1–3 Judd Trump
Ali Carter 3–1 Michael Holt
Matthew Selt 2–3 Marco Fu
Judd Trump 3–0 Michael Holt
Robert Milkins 0–3 Marco Fu
Stuart Bingham 2–3 Robert Milkins
Matthew Selt 3–2 Ali Carter
Marco Fu 3–0 Michael Holt
Judd Trump 3–1 Robert Milkins
Stuart Bingham 1–3 Ali Carter
Matthew Selt 1–3 Michael Holt
Judd Trump 1–3 Ali Carter
Matthew Selt 3–2 Robert Milkins
Stuart Bingham 3–2 Marco Fu

Table

Play-offs

Group three
Group three was played on 19 and 20 January 2015. Ricky Walden was to take part this group, but he withdrew and was replaced by Peter Ebdon, who scheduled to play in group six before. Ali Carter won the group.

Matches

Marco Fu 3–1 Stuart Bingham
Judd Trump 3–2 Ali Carter
Ryan Day 3–1 Peter Ebdon
Mark Davis 1–3 Judd Trump
Stuart Bingham 3–2 Ryan Day
Ali Carter 3–2 Marco Fu
Judd Trump 2–3 Marco Fu
Peter Ebdon 1–3 Mark Davis
Ryan Day 3–1 Mark Davis
Ali Carter 1–3 Stuart Bingham
Marco Fu 0–3 Mark Davis
Peter Ebdon 1–3 Stuart Bingham
Ali Carter 3–1 Ryan Day
Judd Trump 1–3 Peter Ebdon
Stuart Bingham 1–3 Mark Davis
Judd Trump 2–3 Ryan Day
Marco Fu 0–3 Peter Ebdon
Ali Carter 3–1 Mark Davis
Marco Fu 1–3 Ryan Day
Ali Carter 1–3 Peter Ebdon
Judd Trump 2–3 Stuart Bingham

Table

Play-offs

Group four
Group four was played on 21 and 22 January 2015. Martin Gould was to play in this group, but he moved to group six and was replaced by David Gilbert. Stuart Bingham was the fourth player to qualify for the winners group.

Matches

Mark Davis 1–3 Ryan Day
Stuart Bingham 0–3 Peter Ebdon
David Gilbert 3–2 Matthew Stevens
Michael White 0–3 Mark Davis
Ryan Day 2–3 Stuart Bingham
Peter Ebdon 3–0 David Gilbert
Matthew Stevens 2–3 Michael White
Mark Davis 2–3 Stuart Bingham
Ryan Day 0–3 Peter Ebdon
David Gilbert 1–3 Michael White
Stuart Bingham 2–3 Michael White
Matthew Stevens 3–1 Peter Ebdon
Ryan Day 0–3 David Gilbert
Mark Davis 3–2 Matthew Stevens
Peter Ebdon 3–1 Michael White
Stuart Bingham 3–1 Matthew Stevens
Ryan Day 2–3 Michael White
Mark Davis 1–3 David Gilbert
Stuart Bingham 3–1 David Gilbert
Ryan Day 3–1 Matthew Stevens
Mark Davis 3–2 Peter Ebdon

Table

Play-offs

Group five
Group five was played on 26 and 27 January 2015. This round of group play was won by Mark Davis.

Michael White 2–3 David Gilbert
Mark Davis 3–1 Peter Ebdon
Ronnie O'Sullivan 3–2 Liang Wenbo
Fergal O'Brien 1–3 Mark Davis
Peter Ebdon 0–3 Michael White
David Gilbert 0–3 Ronnie O'Sullivan
Mark Davis 3–1 Michael White
Liang Wenbo 1–3 Fergal O'Brien
Ronnie O'Sullivan 3–0 Fergal O'Brien
Michael White 0–3 Fergal O'Brien
Peter Ebdon 2–3 David Gilbert
Liang Wenbo 0–3 David Gilbert
Mark Davis 3–0 Liang Wenbo
Peter Ebdon 3–2 Ronnie O'Sullivan
Michael White 3–2 Liang Wenbo
David Gilbert 2–3 Fergal O'Brien
Mark Davis 1–3 Ronnie O'Sullivan
Michael White 0–3 Ronnie O'Sullivan
Peter Ebdon 3–1 Fergal O'Brien
Peter Ebdon 2–3 Liang Wenbo
Mark Davis 3-2 David Gilbert

Table

Play-offs

Group six
Group six was played on 28 and 29 January 2015. Martin Gould was to take part this group, but he withdrew and was replaced by Rod Lawler. Ronnie O'Sullivan withdrew from the tournament ahead of this group and was replaced by Ben Woollaston, who went on to win the group.

Matches

Ben Woollaston 0–3 David Gilbert
Fergal O'Brien 3–1 Peter Ebdon
Kurt Maflin 0–3 Ben Woollaston
Dominic Dale 3–0 Rod Lawler
David Gilbert 3–0 Fergal O'Brien
Peter Ebdon 3–0 Dominic Dale
Ben Woollaston 0–3 Fergal O'Brien
Rod Lawler 0–3 Kurt Maflin
David Gilbert 1–3 Peter Ebdon
Dominic Dale 3–1 Kurt Maflin
Rod Lawler 2–3 Peter Ebdon
Fergal O'Brien 3–0 Kurt Maflin
Ben Woollaston 3–0 Rod Lawler
David Gilbert 3–1 Dominic Dale
Peter Ebdon 3–1 Kurt Maflin
Fergal O'Brien 2–3 Rod Lawler
Ben Woollaston 2–3 Dominic Dale
Fergal O'Brien 0–3 Dominic Dale
David Gilbert 3–2 Kurt Maflin
David Gilbert 1–3 Rod Lawler
Ben Woollaston 3–0 Peter Ebdon

Table

Play-offs

Group seven
Group seven was played on 9 and 10 February 2015. Xiao Guodong was the last player to qualify for the winners group.

Matches

Peter Ebdon 1–3 David Gilbert
Dominic Dale 1–3 Fergal O'Brien
Mark Williams 3–0 Peter Ebdon
John Higgins 2–3 Xiao Guodong
David Gilbert 3–2 Dominic Dale
Fergal O'Brien 3–2 John Higgins
Peter Ebdon 3–1 Dominic Dale
Xiao Guodong 3–1 Mark Williams
David Gilbert 3–2 Fergal O'Brien
John Higgins 3–1 Mark Williams
Xiao Guodong 2–3 Fergal O'Brien
Dominic Dale 0–3 Mark Williams
David Gilbert 3–0 John Higgins
Peter Ebdon 3–1 Xiao Guodong
Dominic Dale 0–3 Xiao Guodong
Fergal O'Brien 2–3 Mark Williams
Peter Ebdon 3–0 John Higgins
David Gilbert 3–2 Mark Williams
Dominic Dale 0–3 John Higgins
David Gilbert 2–3 Xiao Guodong
Peter Ebdon 2–3 Fergal O'Brien

Table

Play-offs

Winners' group

The winners' group was played on 11 and 12 February 2015. Stuart Bingham won his first Championship League title.

Matches

Barry Hawkins 0–3 Matthew Selt
Ali Carter 3–1 Stuart Bingham
Xiao Guodong 3–1 Barry Hawkins
Mark Davis 1–3 Ben Woollaston
Matthew Selt 3–2 Ali Carter
Stuart Bingham 1–3 Mark Davis
Barry Hawkins 3–0 Ali Carter
Ben Woollaston 3–2 Xiao Guodong
Matthew Selt 1–3 Stuart Bingham
Mark Davis 3–0 Xiao Guodong
Ben Woollaston 1–3 Stuart Bingham
Ali Carter 3–1 Xiao Guodong
Barry Hawkins 3–2 Ben Woollaston
Matthew Selt 1–3 Mark Davis
Ali Carter 1–3 Ben Woollaston
Stuart Bingham 0–3 Xiao Guodong
Matthew Selt 3–0 Xiao Guodong
Barry Hawkins 3–0 Mark Davis
Matthew Selt 3–2 Ben Woollaston
Ali Carter 2–3 Mark Davis
Barry Hawkins 0–3 Stuart Bingham

Table

Play-offs

Century breaks
Total: 79

 147 (1), 118, 110, 109, 105  Barry Hawkins
 147 (7), 113, 107, 103, 100, 100  David Gilbert
 139 (W), 124, 116, 108, 105  Matthew Selt
 139 (5), 101  Michael White
 138 (2), 129, 110, 103, 102  Ali Carter
 137 (3), 136, 125, 105, 104, 103, 100, 100  Judd Trump
 137 (3), 127, 123, 120, 108, 105, 103, 101  Peter Ebdon
 136, 121  John Higgins
 134, 134, 130, 108, 101  Marco Fu
 134, 134, 126, 120, 118, 115, 110, 108, 103, 101  Stuart Bingham
 132 (6), 125, 103  Dominic Dale
 131 (4), 128, 118, 117, 103  Mark Davis
 131 (4), 105  Matthew Stevens
 128, 126, 101, 100  Ronnie O'Sullivan
 127, 123, 111, 105  Fergal O'Brien
 123, 100  Neil Robertson
 112  Liang Wenbo
 101  Ben Woollaston
 100  Ryan Day

''Bold: highest break in the indicated group.

Winnings

Green: won the group. Bold: highest break in the group. All prize money in GBP.

References

2015
Championship League
Championship League
Championship League
Championship League